Pushing Electric was released on November 28, 2012 and is the second full-length record from Oshawa, Ontario duo The Standstills. This album was self-produced by the band and was recorded in a home studio with the help of assistant engineer Damien Jacobs. This album was mixed once again by JUNO Award winner Dan Brodbeck, who handled the mixing duties for their previous two releases. There has been two music videos released from this album for the tracks "Good God Damn" and "Jesus" both directed by Dave Cardoso.

This album is dedicated to Nikola Tesla.

Track listing

The Standstills albums
2012 albums
Self-released albums